Washington Township is one of ten townships in Gibson County, Indiana. As of the 2010 census, its population was 785 and it contained 345 housing units. Like Wabash Township, Washington Township also has no organized seat within the township, despite its two corporation-worthy towns Mount Olympus and Wheeling. Patoka, in White River Township, serves as the seat.

Washington Township was organized in 1824, and named for President George Washington.

History
The Trippett-Glaze-Duncan-Kolb Farm was listed on the National Register of Historic Places in 1993, with a boundary increase in 2009.

Geography

Point of Interest

Unincorporated towns
 Giro (Buena Vista)
 Mount Olympus
 Oatsville
 Wheeling

Adjacent townships
Gibson County
 Center Township (south)
 Patoka Township (southwest)
 White River Township (west)
Knox County
 Johnson Township (north)
Pike County
 Clay Township (northeast)
 Logan Township (east)

Cemeteries
The township contains five cemeteries: Armstrong, Kirk, Kirk-McRoberts, Phillips and Richardson.

Major highways
 Indiana State Road 56
 Indiana State Road 65

Education
Washington Township is served by the North Gibson School Corporation although not having any schools of its own since the early 1970s.

References
 U.S. Board on Geographic Names (GNIS)
 United States Census Bureau cartographic boundary files

External links
 Indiana Township Association
 United Township Association of Indiana

Townships in Gibson County, Indiana
Townships in Indiana